The  was a 1905 German design that was purchased by the Empire of Japan as the standard heavy howitzer of the Imperial Japanese Army at the end of the Russo-Japanese War. The Type 38 designation was given to this gun as it was accepted in the 38th year of Emperor Meiji's reign (1905).

History and development
As Japan's priority lay in her navy, the Imperial Army was given a back seat to new land warfare designs, as well as the raw material (steel) needed to build them.  Thus, like the US who purchased French Renault tanks (Model 1917s) for its first tank units, the planners at the Imperial Japanese Army General Staff found it necessary to purchase artillery, and turned to Krupp in Germany. Initial units were imported, and then further production was made under license by the Army’s Osaka Arsenal starting in 1911.

After World War I, these weapons were considered largely obsolete and efforts were made to replace it with the Type 4 15 cm howitzer.  However, it was still found in front line heavy artillery regiments.

Design
The Type 38 150mm Howitzer was a conventional design for its day, complete with crew seats on the gun shield and a solid box trail. It had a hydro-spring recoil system, interrupted screw type breechblock, and 1/16-inch gun shield. It was designed to be moved by a team of eight horses, but in practice, its heavy weight was a problem.

The Type 38 150mm field gun (improved) was capable of firing High-explosive, shrapnel, incendiary, smoke and illumination and gas shells.

Surplus weapons were mounted on the modified chassis of the Type 97 Chi-Ha medium tank as the Type 4 Ho-Ro self-propelled gun.

Combat record
Although obsolete, the Type 38 150mm field gun was found in theatres of operation in the Second Sino-Japanese War, Soviet-Japanese Border Wars and in the early Pacific War. Against the Chinese, the Type 38 was used with some success due to the fact the Chinese were desperately lacking in heavy artillery in the early part of the war. However, whenever the Japanese did face Chinese heavy artillery typically armed with German 15 cm sFH 18 heavy artillery guns, e.g. in the Battles of Wuhan and Changsha, Japanese gun crews found themselves both badly outranged and hopelessly outgunned and the Type 38 was withdrawn from front-line service. In 1942 however, as the Type 4 Ho-Ro self-propelled gun, units were deployed on Luzon and other islands in the Philippines, and were used in combat against American forces at the Battle of the Philippines in 1944. Other units were retained on the Japanese home islands in anticipation of the projected Allied invasion. As well as Japanese use this type of gun saw use with the Finnish army in the Winter War. They were obtained by the Finns by being captured from the red side of the Finnish Civil War.

Notes

References
 Bishop, Chris (ed.). The Encyclopedia of Weapons of World War II. Barnes & Noble. 1998. .
 Chamberlain, Peter and Gander, Terry. Heavy Artillery. Macdonald and Jane's, 1975. .
 Chant, Chris. Artillery of World War II. Zenith Press, 2001. .
 McLean, Donald B. Japanese Artillery; Weapons and Tactics. Wickenburg, Ariz.: Normount Technical Publications, 1973. .
 Mayer, S.L. The Rise and Fall of Imperial Japan. The Military Press, 1984. .
 US War Department Special Series No 25 Japanese Field Artillery. October 1944
 US Department of War. TM 30-480, Handbook on Japanese Military Forces. Louisiana State University Press, 1994. .
 Zaloga, Steven J. Japanese Tanks 1939–45. Osprey, 2007. .

External links

 Type 38 on Taki's Imperial Japanese Army page
 US Technical Manual E 30-480
 Type 38 Walkaround on Dishmodels.ru

World War I artillery of Japan
World War II field artillery
3
World War I howitzers
150 mm artillery